Andre Agassi was the defending champion but did not compete that year.

Filip Dewulf won in the final 7–5, 6–2, 1–6, 7–5 against Thomas Muster.

Seeds

Draw

Final

Section 1

Section 2

External links
 1995 CA-TennisTrophy draw

Singles